Dennenloher See is a lake in Ansbach, Bavaria, Germany. It has a surface area of 20 hectares. The lake is located 14 km west of Gunzenhausen, Dennenlohe. It is the smallest body of water in the Franconian Lake District.

Neighbouring Lakes 
 Altmühlsee
 Großer Brombachsee
 Igelsbachsee
 Kleiner Brombachsee
 Rothsee
 Hahnenkammsee

References 

Lakes of Bavaria